The 2018–19 Ukrainian Premier League season was the 28th top level football club competitions since the fall of the Soviet Union and the eleventh since the establishment of the Ukrainian Premier League.

The tournament started on 21 July 2018 with the competition set to end on 25 May 2019. The league took its winter intermission after Round 18 on 8 December 2018 and resumed its competition of the Championship with Round 19 on 16 February 2019. The first stage ended with Round 22 games on 17 March 2019. The draw for the second stage was announced for 5 March 2019.

The defending champion is the 11-times winner Shakhtar Donetsk.

Teams

Promoted teams
 Arsenal Kyiv – the champion of the 2017–18 Ukrainian First League  (returning as a phoenix club of previous Arsenal Kyiv after five seasons absence)
 Desna Chernihiv – 3rd place of the 2017–18 Ukrainian First League, play-off winners (debut)

Shuffled teams
 FC Lviv – a team swap after merging with NK Veres Rivne (returning as a phoenix club of previous FC Lviv after nine seasons absence)

On completion of the 2017–18 Ukrainian Premier League season, Veres Rivne, who had moved their operations to Lviv during the season announced the merging with FC Lviv who competed in the 2017–18 Ukrainian Second League and retain their name. This is the first time of such "swap" that has occurred with a team from the Ukrainian Premier League. Its certification the club passed on 5 June 2018. Along with that the FFU certification committee is consulting with the UEFA in regards of the "clubs swap". On 6 June 2018, it was announced that it is too early speculate composition of the league for the next season as the UEFA will make its final decision by allowing or not participation of FC Lviv. It is possible that some of already relegated clubs might be given a second chance if UEFA will insist on impossibility of the Lviv-Veres team swap. On 12 June 2018, Ukrainian Premier League updated its website removing any mentioning of NK Veres Rivne ever competing in the league and its record being awarded to FC Lviv. Few days later the league recovered the Veres' record. More to the story, in interview to "Tribuna" a head of the FFU Attestation Committee Viktor Bezsmernyi explained that it was Veres that received certificate for the 2018–19 Ukrainian Premier League and then the club changed its name. At same time the old-new president of Veres Khakhlyov demonstrated the club's certificate for the 2018–19 Ukrainian Second League.

Withdrawn teams
 On 21 June 2018, during the club's conference of FC Poltava, the club's leadership announced that it dissolved the club.

On 22 June 2018, the UPL published an official announcement about situation with FC Poltava, and while shocked with the club's decision the league is confirming that the club is withdrawing and that the league will be seeking its replacement. Following withdrawal of FC Poltava, a crisis has seemed to ripen in the league as there is no other team can replace Poltava due to financing or infrastructure issues. Based on the voting conducted among the UPL members, on 26 June 2018, the league picked FC Chornomorets Odesa for the Poltava's replacement and submitted its selection for approval by the FFU Executive Committee. On 3 July 2018, Chornomorets was officially approved by FFU as 2018–19 Ukrainian Premier League participant.

Location map
The following displays the location of teams.

Stadiums
Three teams play their matches outside of home towns. The minimum threshold for the stadium's capacity in the UPL is 5,000 (Article 10, paragraph 7.2).

The following stadiums are regarded as home grounds:

Notes:

Managerial changes

Notes:

First stage

First stage table

First stage results
Teams play each other twice on a home and away basis, before the league split into two groups – the top six and the bottom six.

Notes:

First stage positions by round 
The following table represents the teams position after each round in the competition played chronologically.

Championship round

Championship round table

Championship round results

Championship round positions by round

Relegation round

Relegation round table

Relegation round results

Relegation round positions by round

Relegation play-offs 
Teams that placed 10th and 11th in the 2018–19 Ukrainian Premier League play two-leg play-off with the second and third teams of the 2018–19 Ukrainian First League. The draw for play-offs took place on 24 May 2019 and the games will be played on 4 and 8 June 2019.

First leg

Second leg

Kolos Kovalivka won 2–0 on aggregate and were promoted to the 2019–20 Ukrainian Premier League. Chornomorets Odesa were relegated to the 2019–20 Ukrainian First League

Karpaty Lviv won 3–0 on aggregate and retained their spot in the 2019–20 Ukrainian Premier League.  Volyn Lutsk remained in the 2019–20 Ukrainian First League

Due to fan violence at the game and attack on referee, the original score 1–3 was scratched and replaced with technical score 0–3 loss to Volyn and win for Karpaty. Additionally, the Lutsk department of police started criminal proceedings on the fact of intentional damage to property during the game by the Karpaty fans.

Season statistics

Top goalscorers 

Notes:

Top assistants

Hat-tricks 

(number) Player scored (number) goals if more than 3

Notes:

 On 18 September 2018 Ukrainian Premier League introduced publishing of UPL statistics using the system of InStat.

Awards

Monthly awards

Round awards 
Source:

The 2018 Coach of the Year award
The best coaches were identified by the All-Ukrainian Football Coaches Association.

Season awards
The laureates of the 2018–19 UPL season were:
 Best player:  Viktor Tsyhankov (Dynamo Kyiv)
 Best coach:  Paulo Fonseca (Shakhtar Donetsk)
 Best goalkeeper:  Andriy Pyatov (Shakhtar Donetsk)
 Best arbiter:  Anatoliy Abdula (Kharkiv)
 Best young player:  Vitalii Mykolenko (Dynamo Kyiv)
 Best goalscorer:  Júnior Moraes (Shakhtar Donetsk)

See also 
 2018–19 Ukrainian First League
 2018–19 Ukrainian Second League
 2018–19 Ukrainian Cup
 List of Ukrainian football transfers summer 2018
 List of Ukrainian football transfers winter 2018–19

References

External links 
 Official website of the Ukrainian Premier League
 News, stats, updates. campeones.ua.

Ukrainian Premier League seasons
1
Ukr